Zotung or Zotung Chin may refer to:

Zotung people, an ethnic group in Chin State, Myanmar
Zotung language

Language and nationality disambiguation pages